The apostolic blessing or papal blessing is a blessing imparted by the pope, either directly or by delegation through others. Bishops are empowered to grant it three times a year and any priest can do so for the dying.

The apostolic blessing is not to be confused with an episcopal blessing, also known as a pontifical blessing, which bishops can impart at any time by their own authority.

Personal imparting 

A particularly solemn form of imparting the apostolic blessing is as an Urbi et Orbi blessing, .

The pope gives his blessing in many ways. He may use, with or without the introductory liturgical greeting, Dominus vobiscum, the formula of pontifical blessing that any other bishop may use. This was the formula used by Pope Paul VI (without Dominus vobiscum) when he gave his blessing at his first appearance on the balcony of St. Peter's Basilica following his election at the 1963 conclave, and by Pope Benedict XVI (with "Dominus vobiscum") after announcing on 11 February 2013 his intention to resign the papacy, and (without "Dominus vobiscum") at his farewell audience for the cardinals. At a general audience, when the blessing immediately follows the singing of the Pater Noster, it is naturally given without "Dominus vobiscum".

Delegated imparting 

Within his own diocese, a bishop may impart the apostolic blessing three times a year on solemn feasts. The same holds, within their territories, for non-bishop prelates (such as an apostolic prefect) recognized by canon law as juridically equivalent to diocesan bishops. In exceptional circumstances, they can impart it also on other occasions. The blessing is imparted in place of the normal blessing at the end of Mass, using a particular formula.

A plenary indulgence is granted to those who devoutly receive the papal blessing when imparted by the pope himself in the Urbi et Orbi form or by their own bishop in accordance with this authorization. It is granted also to those who are unable to be present at the rite itself and who instead follow it piously by radio, television, or the internet.

Apostolic Nuncios also are delegated to impart the papal blessing in written form.

The Church's ritual book on the Pastoral Care of the Sick uses the term "Apostolic Pardon" for what elsewhere, for instance in the Enchiridion Indulgentiarum, is called the "Apostolic Blessing with attached plenary indulgence". Priests are urged to impart it to the dying, but if a priest cannot be had, the Church grants a plenary indulgence, to be acquired at the moment of death, to any rightly disposed Christian who in life was accustomed to say some prayers, with the Church itself supplying the four conditions normally required for gaining a plenary indulgence (recent Sacramental Confession, reception of Holy Communion, prayers for the pope's intentions, and detachment from all sin).

Notes

References

Catholic liturgy